Bradley Norton (born 11 January 1991) is an Australian footballer who plays for and captains South Melbourne FC in the NPL Victoria.

Career

Norton made his first appearances at senior level in 2008 with Port Melbourne Sharks. He then moved to Melbourne Knights in 2009 before being selected in the Melbourne Victory youth squad for 2009–10 season.

Adelaide United
Norton initially joined Adelaide United as youth team player in 2010. He made his first senior debut for Adelaide on 24 September 2010 replacing Joe Keenan in the 87th minute in the game against Perth Glory. and was later signed to a senior contract with the club. He was released by Adelaide in September 2011 to return to his hometown Melbourne.

References

External links
 Melbourne Victory Youth profile

1991 births
Living people
Australian soccer players
Port Melbourne SC players
Adelaide United FC players
A-League Men players
National Premier Leagues players
Association football fullbacks
Soccer players from Melbourne